Greg Meyer (born September 18, 1955) is an American long-distance runner. Meyer's winning time for the 1983 Boston Marathon race was 2:09.00. He was the last American to win the Boston Marathon until 2014, and the last person born in America to win the Chicago Marathon until 2017. He set ten American road racing records and two world records, and won the River Bank Run, in his home town of Grand Rapids, seven times.

Personal life

Meyer was born in Grand Rapids, MI to parents Rita and Jay. He has one older sibling, Matthew Meyer. Meyer is a 1973 graduate of Grand Rapids West Catholic High School. In 1977 he earned a degree in education and social studies from the University of Michigan in Ann Arbor, MI.  In 1986 he earned a Master of Education degree from Boston University. He met and married fellow runner Paula Lettis in 1980  while living in Boston and together they had three children, Nicolle (1981), Jacob (1983) and Daniel (1986). Meyer and Lettis divorced in 2005 while living in Dexter, MI. Meyer remarried in May 2019. He and his wife Kerry reside near Rockford, MI.

Career

Greg was employed from approximately 2000 through 2008 by the University of Michigan as director of Major Gifts for the Greater Michigan Region, where he helped raise over $125 million for the university. From 2008-2012 Meyer served as Associate Vice President for Institutional Advancement at Aquinas College. In Fall of 2012, he became the VP & Executive Director of the Aquinas Foundation. After his time at Aquinas, he served as the VP of Development and Communication for the YMCA of Greater Grand Rapids from 2015-2018. In October 2018, Greg joined University of Michigan Health-West as their Chief Community Officer aligning his track record (no pun intended) in building community relationships perfectly with the hospital system's mission of relentlessly advancing health to serve West Michigan.

Running accomplishments

Meyer set American road racing records in the 8K, the 10K, and the 15K. He set world records in the 10-mile run and the 25K. He was the first University of Michigan runner to break the four-minute mile mark. In 1978, Meyer won the U.S. Amateur Athletic Union's cross country running title, in 29:35.9, narrowly edging out Alberto Salazar. The U.S. boycotted the 1980 Summer Olympics, and Meyer finished 7th in the 1984 Trials. Meyer's winning time for the 1983 Boston Marathon race was 2:09.00. He was the last American to win the Boston Marathon until 2014, and the last person born in America to win the Chicago Marathon until 2017. He set ten American road racing records and two world records, and won the River Bank Run, in his home town of Grand Rapids, seven times. Meyer was inducted into the U of M Athletic Hall of Honor and was inducted into the Michigan Sports Hall of Fame in 2011.

See also
 List of winners of the Boston Marathon

References

External links
 National Distance Running Hall of Fame profile
 Greg Meyer Photo
 Greg Meyer: Running Man, Money Man
 Greg Meyer: helping kick start YMCA Run for Your Heart Program in Saginaw

Living people
1955 births
Sportspeople from Grand Rapids, Michigan
American male long-distance runners
American male marathon runners
Chicago Marathon male winners
Boston Marathon male winners
University of Michigan alumni
People from Dexter, Michigan
Boston University School of Education alumni